Alberto Mancini won in the final 6–3, 4–6, 2–6, 7–6, 6–1 against Andre Agassi.

Ivan Lendl was the defending champion but did not compete this year.

Seeds

  Mats Wilander (third round)
  Andre Agassi (final)
  Kent Carlsson (first round)
  Miloslav Mečíř (first round)
  Jimmy Connors (third round)
  Emilio Sánchez (third round)
  Aaron Krickstein (second round)
  Guillermo Pérez Roldán (quarterfinals)
  Ronald Agénor (first round)
  Darren Cahill (third round)
  Alberto Mancini (champion)
  Andrés Gómez (first round)
  Jaime Yzaga (third round)
  Horst Skoff (first round)
  Marcelo Filippini (second round)
  Mark Woodforde (first round)

Draw

Finals

Top half

Section 1

Section 2

Bottom half

Section 3

Section 4

External links
 1989 Italian Open draw

Men's Singles